Abraham Lincoln High School may refer to:

 Abraham Lincoln High School (Los Angeles, California)
 Abraham Lincoln High School (San Francisco, California)
 Abraham Lincoln High School (San Jose, California)
 Abraham Lincoln High School (Colorado), Denver, Colorado
 Abraham Lincoln High School (Council Bluffs, Iowa)
 Abraham Lincoln High School (Des Moines, Iowa)
 Abraham Lincoln High School (Minnesota), Bloomington, closed in 1982
 Abraham Lincoln High School (Brooklyn), New York
 Abraham Lincoln High School (Philadelphia), Pennsylvania
 Abraham Lincoln High School (Port Arthur, Texas), merged into Memorial High School

See also
 Lincoln High School (disambiguation)